Ladozhskaya is a station on the Line 4 of Saint Petersburg Metro, opened on December 30, 1985.

Transport 
Buses: 5, 21, 24, 27, 30, 46, 77, 82, 92, 123, 131, 183, 185, 222, 271, 295, 429, 453, 462, 531, 532, 533, 860Л. Trolleybuses: 22. Trams: 7, 8, 59, 63, 64. Minibuses: 430, 430A, 531A, 462P, 

Saint Petersburg Metro stations
Railway stations in Russia opened in 1985
1985 establishments in the Soviet Union
Railway stations located underground in Russia